Mac Barnett  is an American writer of children's books living in Oakland, California.

Barnett graduated from Pomona College, where he studied under the writer David Foster Wallace.

Extra Yarn, a picture book illustrated by Jon Klassen, won the 2012 Boston Globe–Horn Book Award and 2013 E.B. White Read Aloud Award. It was a Caldecott Medal Honor Book. Sam  & Dave Dig a Hole, illustrated by Jon Klassen, won a Caldecott Honor and the 2015 E.B. White Read Aloud Award.

Works

Novels 
 Brixton Brothers mystery novels published by Simon & Schuster (S&S): 
  The Case of the Case Mistaken Identity, illustrated by Adam Rex (Oct 6, 2009)
  The Ghostwriter Secret, illus. Adam Rex (Oct 5, 2010)
  It Happened on a Train, illus. Adam Rex (Oct 4, 2011)
  Danger Goes Berserk, illus. Matthew Myers (Oct 2, 2013)

 The Terrible Two - By Mac Barnett and Jory John, with illustrations by Kevin Cornell (Amulet Books)
 The Terrible Two (January 2015)
 The Terrible Two Get Worse (January 2016)
 The Terrible Two Go Wild (January 2018)
 The Terrible Two's Last Laugh (January 2019)
  Mac Barnett Kid Spy - By Mac Barnett , with illustrations by Mike Lowery
  Mac B., Kid Spy: Mac Undercover  (September 2018)
  Mac B., Kid Spy: The Impossible Crime  (December 2018)
  Mac B., Kid Spy: The Top-Secret Smackdown  (March 2019)
  Mac B., Kid Spy: Mac Cracks the Code  (December 2019)
  Mac B., Kid Spy: The Sound of Danger  (September 2020)
  Mac B., Kid Spy: Mac Saves the World  (May 2021)

Picture books 
  Billy Twitters and His Blue Whale Problem, illustrated by Adam Rex (Hyperion Books, June 23, 2009)
  Guess Again!, illustrated by Adam Rex (Simon & Schuster, September 15, 2009)
  The Clock without a Face: a Gus Twintig mystery (McSweeney's, April 27, 2010) – "by Scott Teplin, Mac Barnett & Eli Horowitz; plus faces by Adam Rex & numbers by Anna Sheffield" , board book 
  Oh No! (Or How My Science Project Destroyed the World), illustrated by Dan Santat (Hyperion, June 1, 2010)
  Mustache!, illustrated by Kevin Cornell (Hyperion, October 25, 2011)
  Extra Yarn, illustrated by Jon Klassen (Balzer + Bray, January 17, 2012)
  Chloe and the Lion, illustrated by Adam Rex (Hyperion, April 3, 2012)
  Oh No, Not Again! (Or How I Built a Time Machine to Save History) (Or at Least My History Grade), illustrated by Dan Santat (Hyperion, June 5, 2012)
  Count the Monkeys, illustrated by Kevin Cornell, (Hyperion, June 24, 2012)
  Battle Bunny (S&S, 2013) – "by Jon Scieszka and Mac Barnett and Alex; pictures by Matthew Myers but mostly Alex." , 
 President Taft is Stuck in the Bath, illustrated by Chris Van Dusen (Candlewick Press, 2014) 
 Sam and Dave Dig a Hole, illustrated by Jon Klassen (Candlewick Press, Oct 2014) 
 Telephone, illustrated by Jen Corace (Chronicle Books, September 2014) 
 Rules of the House, illustrated by Matthew Myers (Hyperion, Apr 2015) 
 The Skunk, illustrated by Patrick McDonnell (Roaring Book Press, Apr 2015)
 Leo: A Ghost Story, illustrated by Christian Robinson
 How This Book Was Made, illustrated by Adam Rex (Disney-Hyperion, Sep 2016)
 The Magic Word, illustrated by Elise Parsley
 Noisy Night, illustrated by Brian Biggs
 Triangle, illustrated by Jon Klassen
 Square, illustrated by Jon Klassen
 Circle, illustrated by Jon Klassen
 Places to Be, illustrated by Renata Liwska
 I Love You Like a Pig, illustrated by Greg Pizzoli
 The Wolf, the Duck, and the Mouse, illustrated by Jon Klassen
 What Is Love?, illustrated by Carson Ellis
The Three Billy Goats Gruff, Illustrated by Jon Klassen.

Short fiction 
 "Best of Friends", Funny Business (Guys Read, 1), ed. Jon Scieszka (NY: Walden Pond Press, 2010)

Awards 
 2015 Winner, The E.B. White Read Aloud Award
 2015 Honor, Caldecott Medal
 2015 Winner, Irma Black Award
 2013 Winner, E.B. White Read-Aloud Award
 2013 Honor, Caldecott Medal
 2020 Winner, Picture Book Category of the German Youth Literature Awards for the 2020 one-volume German edition of his trilogy "Triangle", "Square", and "Circle"

References

External links 

 
 Interview of Barnett and illustrator Adam Rex
 

American children's writers
Living people
Place of birth missing (living people)
Pomona College alumni
Year of birth missing (living people)